Frieseomelitta is a stingless bee (Meliponini) genus in the family Apidae. It currently contains about 16 described species:
 Frieseomelitta dispar
 Frieseomelitta doederleini 
 Frieseomelitta flavicornis 
 Frieseomelitta francoi 
 Frieseomelitta freiremaiai 
 Frieseomelitta languida 
 Frieseomelitta lehmanni 
 Frieseomelitta longipes 
 Frieseomelitta meadewaldoi 
 Frieseomelitta nigra 
 Frieseomelitta paranigra 
 Frieseomelitta paupera 
 Frieseomelitta portoi 
 Frieseomelitta silvestrii 
 Frieseomelitta trichocerata 
 Frieseomelitta varia

Bibliography 
 Wolf Engels (Editor): Social Insects: An Evolutionary Approach to Castes and Reproduction, Springer Science & Business Media, Dec 6, 2012 - 265 pages. . Here: Chapter 7: Wolf Engels, Vera L. Imperatriz-Fonseca: Caste Development, Reproductive Strategies, and Control of Fertility in Honey Bees and Stingless Bees, 4.3 Young Queens in the Multigynous Stingless Bee Nest, p186

References

Meliponini
Bee genera
Apinae